Three ships of the Royal Navy have borne the name HMS Loyalty:

 was a 34-gun ship in service between 1650 and 1653.
 was a stores hulk purchased in 1694. She foundered in 1701.
 was an  launched in 1942 as HMS Rattler. She was renamed HMS Loyalty in 1943 and was sunk in 1944.

Royal Navy ship names